Anthony Limbrick (born 9 April 1983) is an Australian professional football manager and former player, who was most recently manager of Cymru Premier club The New Saints. 

As a player, Limbrick played at a semi-professional level for Australian sides Riverside Olympic, Bundaberg Waves and Rochedale Rovers before emigrating to England in 2005 where he featured for non-league sides Northwood and Wingate & Finchley. Since moving into coaching he has notably worked for Premier League sides Southampton and West Ham United as well as the England under-17's. He was appointed manager of Woking in 2017 before a spell as Ian Holloway's assistant manager at Grimsby Town. Limbrick is one of few notable Australian managers who have coached in the United Kingdom, others including Ange Postecoglou of Celtic and Harry Kewell, formerly of Football League sides such as Barnet.

Club career
Born in Hobart, Tasmania, Limbrick later moved to Launceston, attending Riverside High School. During Limbrick's time in Tasmania, he played for Riverside Olympic, before moving to Queensland on mainland Australia, playing for Bundaberg Waves and Rochedale Rovers. Limbrick later played Non-League football in England for Northwood and Wingate & Finchley, before a broken leg ended his playing career.

Managerial career

Youth Coaching, Woking and Grimsby Town 
In 2007, Limbrick became a youth team coach at Boreham Wood. In 2007, he returned to former club Wingate & Finchley as first team coach, leaving in 2010 to join Southampton as a youth coach, working under first team managers Mauricio Pochettino and Ronald Koeman. Limbrick was later part of the coaching staff at for England under-17's and West Ham United's academy.

In May 2017, Limbrick was appointed manager of National League club Woking, leading the club to the FA Cup second round, after beating Football League club Bury. In April 2018, after a nine-game winless run, Limbrick was sacked as manager of Woking. Ahead of the 2018–19 EFL League Two season, Limbrick was appointed assistant manager to Michael Jolley at Grimsby Town. In November 2019, following the departure of Jolley via mutual consent, Limbrick was named interim manager of Grimsby before reverting to assistant following the appointment of Ian Holloway. Limbrick departed Grimsby in September 2020.

The New Saints 
On 2 April 2021, Limbrick was appointed manager of Cymru Premier club The New Saints following the dismissal of Scott Ruscoe. On 11 April 2021, Limbrick took charge of his first Cymru Premier match, which saw The New Saints secure a 1–0 home win over Bala Town. Limbrick saw out the rest of the Cymru Premier season with seven wins, a draw and only one loss to finish second in the table and qualify for the 2021-22 UEFA Europa Conference League first qualifying round.

In the inaugural season of the UEFA Europa Conference League, Limbrick's 2021–22 side cruised through qualifying rounds 1 and 2, beating Glentoran and FK Kauno Žalgiris. However, their momentum quickly shrivelled after a penalty shootout heartbreak in the second leg of the third round against Viktoria Plzeň, despite their impressive first-leg win their European journey came to a sudden end. Following the game, Limbrick explained, "When you play these top teams there's fine margins, we conceded late in both games and the players were dead on their feet by the end because they couldn't have done anymore." Despite the European exit, The New Saints dominated the opening of The 2021–22 Cymru Premier, remaining undefeated after the first seven league fixtures. Following this success in the league, Limbrick was awarded Cymru Premier Manager of the Month.

On 11 March 2022, Limbrick became the first Australian manager to win a top-flight European football league after his side drew 3−3 with Penybont to seal the 2021−22 title. Limbrick's side claimed the Welsh Cup with a 3–2 win over Penybont in the final.

Limbrick was sacked in July 2022, due to The New Saints' disappointing performances in European competitions.

Career statistics

Manager 

 As of match played 26 July 2022

Honours

Manager 

The New Saints

 Cymru Premier: 2021–22
 Welsh Cup: 2021−22

Individual
 Cymru Premier Manager of the Month: August 2021, January 2022

References

Living people
Sportspeople from Hobart
Soccer players from Tasmania
Australian soccer players
Association football defenders
Australian expatriate soccer players
Australian expatriate sportspeople in England
Australian expatriate sportspeople in Wales
Northwood F.C. players
Wingate & Finchley F.C. players
Southampton F.C. non-playing staff
West Ham United F.C. non-playing staff
Woking F.C. managers
National League (English football) managers
Grimsby Town F.C. non-playing staff
Grimsby Town F.C. managers
English Football League managers
The New Saints F.C. managers
Cymru Premier managers
Australian soccer coaches
Association football coaches
1983 births
Expatriate football managers in Wales
Australian expatriate soccer coaches